The Scout and Guide movement in Latvia is served by:
 Latvijas Skautu un Gaidu Centrālā Organizācija, member of the World Association of Girl Guides and Girl Scouts and of the World Organization of the Scout Movement
 Katoļu gaidu un skautu organizācija, candidate for membership within the Union Internationale des Guides et Scouts d'Europe
 some independent regional organizations

See also

Scouting in displaced persons camps